Huw Sutton is a Welsh rugby union player, currently playing for United Rugby Championship side Ospreys. His preferred position is lock.

Ospreys
Sutton was named in Ospreys squad for the Round 4 match of the 2021–22 European Rugby Champions Cup against . He made his debut in the same fixture, coming on as a replacement.

References

Living people
Welsh rugby union players
Ospreys (rugby union) players
Rugby union locks
Year of birth missing (living people)